The 1986 Big South Conference men's basketball tournament was the inaugural tournament for the Big South Conference, taking place March 3–5, 1986, at the Savannah Civic Center in Savannah, Georgia. The Baptist College Buccaneers (now known as Charleston Southern) won the tournament, led by head coach Tommy Gaither.

Format
All of the conference's eight members participated in the tournament, hosted at the Savannah Civic Center. Teams were seeded by conference winning percentage.

Bracket

* Asterisk indicates overtime game
Source

All-Tournament Team
Ben Hinson, Charleston Southern
Bernard Innocent, Charleston Southern
Eric Rogers, Augusta State
Eric Juratic, Augusta State
Byron Samuels, UNC Asheville
Allen Washington, Winthrop

References

Tournament
Big South Conference men's basketball tournament
Big South Conference men's basketball tournament
Big South Conference men's basketball tournament